The 1944 New Hampshire Wildcats football team represented the University of New Hampshire in the 1944 college football season. The Wildcats were led by first-year head coach Herbert Snow and completed the season with a record of 1–3. The team played its home games at Lewis Field (also known as Lewis Stadium) in Durham, New Hampshire.

Background 
New Hampshire had not fielded a team in 1943, due to World War II. In mid-September 1944, university administrators approved an "informal" team, limited to four games, with a roster consisting of 17-year-olds and returning veterans. The program's most recent head coach, Charles M. Justice, had entered the Navy in April 1944. Selected as his successor was Herbert Snow, a Springfield College graduate who had been the head coach at Wellesley High School in Massachusetts. The team began practices in early October, with only one player from their 1942 squad—Claude Henry, a reserve back who had returned to the university after serving in the Marine Corps.

Schedule

The 1944 games remain the last time that the Middlebury and New Hampshire football programs have met.

Roster

Source:

Game summaries

October 21: at Maine

October 28: vs. Middlebury

November 4: at Middlebury

November 11: vs. Maine

Statistics

Scores by quarter

New Hampshire scoring
{| class="wikitable" style="text-align:center;"
! Player !! Touchdowns !! Conversions !! Points
|-
| Bill Black || 3 || 3 || 21
|-
| Joe Swekla || 2 || – || 12
|-
| Bill Pizzano || 1 || – || 6
|-
! Total || 6 || 3 || 39
|}

Honors
Quarterback Bill Pizzano was named to the All-New England Small College Team; he was later inducted to the university's athletic hall of fame, in 2004.

References

Further reading 
 
 
 
 
 
 

New Hampshire
New Hampshire Wildcats football seasons
New Hampshire Wildcats football